The Afghanistan national under-19 cricket team (Pashto: د افغانستان ۱۹ کلنو لوبډله) represents the country of Afghanistan in under-19 international cricket.

Afghanistan has qualified for the Under-19 Cricket World Cup on seven occasions. The team's first tournament was the 2010 World Cup in New Zealand, which they reached by finishing runner-up to Ireland in the 2009 World Cup Qualifier. Afghanistan has qualified for every subsequent World Cup. Although the team placed 16th and last in its first tournament in 2010, it rapidly became one of the leading under-19 teams in Asia. Afghanistan finished seventh at the 2014 World Cup in the UAE, setting a new record for the best finish by an ICC associate member (equalled by Namibia in 2016). After becoming an ICC full member, Afghanistan reached the semi-finals of the 2018 World Cup in New Zealand.

Outside of the Under-19 World Cup, Afghanistan participates in the annual ACC Under-19 Cup. The team won the tournament in 2017, defeating Pakistan in the final. Afghanistan also plays occasional bilateral series against other Asian under-19 teams.

The team reached the semi-finals in the 2022 Under-19 World Cup, where they lost to England.

History
The team played in the 2010 Under-19 Cricket World Cup in New Zealand. Afghanistan were drawn in Group A, where they played England, Hong Kong and India. Afghanistan got a wooden spoon in this World Cup.

Afghanistan played in the 2012 Under-19 Cricket World Cup. They played against Pakistan, New Zealand and Scotland.

Afghanistan had qualified for 2014 Under-19 Cricket World Cup. They were drawn against Australia, Bangladesh & Namibia in group B who they beat, qualifying for Super league, where they lost to South Africa. They finished tournament well by securing 7th position.

At the Asia cup 
The team made it to the semifinals of the 2016 ACC Under-19 Asia Cup, losing out to India by 77 runs. In the league stages of the tournament Afghanistan lost their first match, being defeated by Bangladesh. However, they won their next two matches against Pakistan and Singapore. They advanced to the semifinals on the basis of NRR.

Afghanistan won the 2017 ACC Under-19 Asia Cup, defeating Pakistan in the final by a huge margin of 185 runs. In the league stages, Afghanistan won their matches against Pakistan and UAE but lost to Sri Lanka. They faced Nepal in the semifinals, whom they defeated by 7 wickets.

Under-19 World Cup record

Records
All records listed are for under-19 One Day International (ODI) matches only.

Team records

Highest totals
 340/9 (50 overs), v. , at Sheikh Kamal International Cricket Stadium, Cox's Bazar, 5 February 2016
 336/7 (50 overs), v. , at Allan Border Field, Brisbane, 21 August 2012
 309/6 (50 overs), v. , at Hagley Oval, Christchurch, 25 January 2018
 284/7 (50 overs), v. , at Cobham Oval, Whangarei, 17 January 2018
 265/6 (50 overs), v. , at North-West University No. 1 Ground, Potchefstroom, 22 January 2020

Lowest totals
 77 (34.2 overs), v. , at Sylhet International Cricket Stadium, Sylhet, 28 September 2017
 86 (32.2 overs), v. , at Nelson Park, Napier, 27 January 2010
 101 (42.3 overs), v. , at Sylhet International Cricket Stadium, Sylhet, 12 September 2021
 101 (39.4 overs), v. , at Sylhet International Cricket Stadium, Sylhet, 14 September 2021
 113 (35.0 overs), v. , at Ekana Cricket Stadium B Ground, 28 November 2019

Individual records

Most career runs
 594 – Ibrahim Zadran (2017-2020)
 425 – Hashmatullah Shahidi (2010-2014)
 407 – Javed Ahmadi (2010-2012)
 382 – Ikram Alikhil (2016-2018)
 363 – Farhan Zakhil (2019-2020)

Highest individual scores
 156 (132 balls) – Karim Janat, v. , at Sheikh Kamal International Cricket Stadium, Cox's Bazar, 5 February 2016
 134 (111 balls) – Javed Ahmadi, v. , at Allan Border Field, Brisbane, 21 August 2012
 107* (113 balls) – Ikram Alikhil, v. , at Kinrara Academy Oval, Kuala Lumpur, 19 November 2017
 106* (142 balls) – Tariq Stanikzai, v. , at Sheikh Kamal International Cricket Stadium, Cox's Bazar, 12 February 2016
 91* (132 balls) – Farhan Zakhil, v. , at North-West University No. 1 Ground, Potchefstroom, 2 February 2020

Most career wickets
 35 – Mujeeb Ur Rahman (2017-2018)
 29 – Shafiqullah Ghafari (2019-2020)
 27 – Qais Ahmad (2017-2018)
 22 – Noor Ahmad (2019-2020)
 21 – Aftab Alam (2010-2012)

Best bowling performances
 7/19 (9.3 overs) – Mujeeb Ur Rahman, v. , at Sylhet International Cricket Stadium, Sylhet, 4 October 2017
 6/15 (9.1 overs) – Shafiqullah Ghafari, v. , at Diamond Oval, Kimberley, 17 January 2020
 6/23 (10 overs) – Mujeeb Ur Rahman, v. , at Kinrara Academy Oval, Kuala Lumpur, 10 November 2017
 6/33 (10 overs) – Aftab Alam, v. , at Nelson Park, Napier, 24 January 2010
 5/15 (7.1 overs) – Mujeeb Ur Rahman, v. , at Kinrara Academy Oval, Kuala Lumpur, 19 November 2017

Current squad
The Afghanistan U-19 Cricket squad selected for 2020 Under-19 Cricket World Cup:
 Farhan Zakhil (c)
 Noor Ahmad
 Sediqullah Atal
 Shafiqullah Ghafari
 Fazalhaq Farooqi
 Imran Mir
 Jamshid Miralikhil
 Abid Mohammadi
 Mohammad Ishaq (wk)
 Asif Musazai
 Abdul Rahman
 Abidullah Taniwal
 Ibrahim Zadran
 Rahmanullah
 Zohaib

References

External links 
Afghanistan at Cricinfo
2010 Under-19 Cricket World Cup squads
ICC Under-19 World Cup Qualifier, 2012

Under-19 cricket teams
Afghanistan in international cricket
2009 establishments in Afghanistan
Cricket clubs established in 2009
National sports teams of Afghanistan